Giulio Marco Bordogni (23 January 1789 – 31 July 1856), usually called just Marco Bordogni, was an Italian operatic tenor and singing teacher of great popularity and success, whose mature career was based in Paris.

Biography

Bordogni was born in Gazzaniga, near Bergamo, Italy. He was a late exponent of that formidable generation of tenors that flourished in Bergamo between the two centuries. Gaetano Crivelli too can be considered an honorary member of the group, having been born in the neighboring Brescia.

Bordogni made his operatic debut in Novara in 1808 without initially meeting with much success. In 1813 he distinguished himself as a performer of the role of Argirio in Rossini's Tancredi at the Ferrara revival with a tragic ending and at the inauguration of the Teatro Re in Milan, and later became very active in promoting that composer's music. He appeared in many of Rossini's operas on their first presentation in various towns and theatres, mainly performing the roles originally sung by Giovanni David. In 1825 he created the role of Conte di Libenskof in Rossini's Il viaggio a Reims. He sang for many years at the Théâtre des Italiens in Paris. He became a teacher at the Paris Conservatoire in 1823 and continued to teach there until shortly before his death, which occurred in Paris. His pupils included Juliette Borghèse and Hermine Küchenmeister-Rudersdorf.

He was the author of a published singing method, and composed many sets of vocalises which remained in use for singers for a century afterwards. He was probably the most influential teacher of the English tenor Sims Reeves, who went to him in 1843: other students include Sophie Cruvelli and Giovanni Matteo Mario.

Bordogni was awarded the Légion d'Honneur on 10 May 1839 by M. de Gasparin, at the same time that it was awarded to the Director of the Opéra Duponchel, and to the composer Hector Berlioz, who wrote that Bordogni was the best singing-master of that period.
His daughter Louise Bordogni sang successfully in New York City in 1834.

Town or theatre first performances of Rossini operas
The following list comprises town or theatre first performances of Rossini operas in which Marco Bordogni appeared. From this list one can recognize the singer's considerable virtuosity, ranging between his traditional baritonal tenor roles, and the leading tenore contraltino parts written by Rossini in tragic, serio-comic and comic operas.

In addition to the Rossini roles, Bordogni also gave first performances at the Théâtre-Italien in Paër’s Agnese di Fitz-Henry (Ernesto) in 1819; in Mayr’s Medea in Corinto (Giasone) in 1823; in Mercadante’s Elisa e Claudio ossia L'amore protetto dall'amicizia (Claudio) (also in 1823); and in Vaccai’s  Giulietta e Romeo (Capellio) in 1827.

Legacy 
In 1928, the Melodious Études for Trombone were published in New York. These études were arranged by Joannès Rochut, then principal trombonist of the Boston Symphony Orchestra. The études had been transcribed directly from Bordogni's "Vocalises". Since then, the "Vocalises" have been transcribed for many instruments and are a standard method of study for many music students.

Notes and references

External links

1788 births
1856 deaths
Academic staff of the Conservatoire de Paris
Chevaliers of the Légion d'honneur
Italian operatic tenors
19th-century Italian male opera singers
Musicians from the Province of Bergamo
Tenor contraltinos